The Flying Classroom is a 1973 West German comedy film directed by Werner Jacobs and starring Joachim Fuchsberger, Heinz Reincke and Diana Körner. Two classes in a school have a running feud. It is based on The Flying Classroom, a novel by Erich Kästner.

It was shot on location around Bamberg in Bavaria.

Partial cast
 Joachim Fuchsberger as Dr. Johannes Bökh (nicknamed "Justus" or "the just")
 Heinz Reincke as Dr. Robert Uthofft (nicknamed "Nichtraucher" or "Non-smoker")
 Diana Körner as  Nurse Beate
 Bernd Herzsprung as Theodor Laban
 Otto Bolesch as Professor Kreuzkamm
 Anita Mally as Inge Kreuzkamm
 Tilo von Berlepsch as Director Grünkern
 Gudula Blau as Mrs. von Simmern
 Wolfgang Schwarz as Mr. von Simmern
 Otto Kurth as Otto Carstens
 Robert Jarczyk as Johnny Trotz
 Thomas Eggert as Sebastian Frank
 Daniel Mueller as Uli von Simmern

References

Bibliography 
 Hans-Michael Bock and Tim Bergfelder. The Concise Cinegraph: An Encyclopedia of German Cinema. Berghahn Books, 2009.

External links

1973 films
West German films
1970s German-language films
Films based on children's books
Films based on German novels
Films based on works by Erich Kästner
Films directed by Werner Jacobs
1970s children's comedy films
German comedy films
Remakes of German films
Films set in schools
Films set in boarding schools
German children's films
Constantin Film films
1973 comedy films
1970s German films